Arussi is a rural locality (a selo) in Karashinsky Selsoviet, Laksky District, Republic of Dagestan, Russia. The population was 182 as of 2010.

Geography 
Arussi is located 242 km north of Kumukh (the district's administrative centre) by road. Tamazatyube Novoye and Novaya Kosa are the nearest rural localities.

Nationalities 
Laks live there.

References 

Rural localities in Laksky District